Sultan Hassan Farah (was a Somali ruler. He was the third Grand Sultan of the Isaaq Sultanate

Biography
Son of Sultan Farah Guled, he was part of the second generation of the Ba Ambaro of the Rer Guled, who are the leading section of the Eidagale Garhajis subclan of Isaaq

Reign
Following a massive conflict between the Ayal Ahmed and Ayal Yunis branches of the Habr Awal over who would control the trade of Berbera, Sultan Hassan brought both the subclans before the holy relic from the tomb of Aw Barkhadle. An item that is said to belong to Bilal Ibn Rabah.

When any grave question arises affecting the interests of the Isaakh tribe in general. On a paper yet carefully preserved in the tomb, and bearing the sign-manual of Belat [Bilal], the slave of one [of] the early khaleefehs, fresh oaths of lasting friendship and lasting alliances are made...In the season of 1846 this relic was brought to Berbera in charge of the Haber Gerhajis, and on it the rival tribes of Aial Ahmed and Aial Yunus swore to bury all animosity and live as brethren. 

Lieutenant C.P Rigby in the year 1848 writes

The Hubr Gajis tribe and its different branches are governed by two Sultans, named Sultan Deriah [Habr Yunis Sultan] and Sultan Farah [Eidagale Sultan]: the residence of the latter is at Toro.

See also
Deria Sugulleh Ainashe 2nd Sultan of the Habr Yunis contemporary of Sultan Farah
Hersi Aman 3rd Sultan of the Habr Yunis and contemporary of Sultan Farah
Isaaq
Garhajis
Habr Awal

References

Somalian Muslims
19th-century Somalian people
Year of birth missing
Year of death missing
Grand Sultans of the Isaaq Sultanate